Alcina (HWV 34) is a 1735 opera seria by George Frideric Handel. Handel used the libretto of L'isola di Alcina, an opera that was set in 1728 in Rome by Riccardo Broschi, which he acquired the year after during his travels in Italy. Partly altered for better conformity, the story was originally taken from Ludovico Ariosto's Orlando furioso (like those of the Handel operas Orlando and Ariodante), an epic poem. The opera contains several musical sequences with opportunity for dance: these were composed for dancer Marie Sallé.

Performance history
Alcina was composed for Handel's first season at the Theatre Royal, Covent Garden in London. It premiered on 16 April 1735. Like the composer's other works in the opera seria genre, Alcina fell into obscurity; after a revival in Brunswick in 1738 it was not performed again until a production in Leipzig in 1928.

The Australian soprano Joan Sutherland sang the role in a production by Franco Zeffirelli in which she made her debut at La Fenice in February 1960 and at the Dallas Opera in November of that year. She performed in the same production at the Royal Opera House, Covent Garden, in 1962. Since then Alcina has been performed on many of the world's stages. A major production was the one directed by Robert Carsen and originally staged for the Opéra de Paris in 1999 and repeated at the Lyric Opera of Chicago. Both stagings featured Renée Fleming in the title role.

The opera was given a concert performance on 10 October 2014 at the Barbican Centre in London. Joyce DiDonato sang the title role under Harry Bicket with The English Concert. Alice Coote, Christine Rice and Anna Christy sang other significant roles. The group toured to the European continent with performances in Pamplona, Madrid, Vienna, and Paris and then to Carnegie Hall in New York on 26 October. Alcina received a fully staged production during the 2017 Santa Fe Opera season with Elza van den Heever in the title role. Among many other performances worldwide, the opera was staged by the Salzburg Festival in 2019, with Cecilia Bartoli in the title role.

Roles

Synopsis

Prologue
The background of the opera comes from the poem Orlando Furioso. The heroic knight Ruggiero is destined to a short but glorious life, and a benevolent magician is always whisking him away from the arms of his fiancée, Bradamante. Bradamante is not the type to put up with the constant disappearance of her lover, and she spends vast portions of the poem in full armor chasing after him. Just before the opera begins she has rescued him from an enchanted castle, only to have her flying horse (a hippogriff) take a fancy to Ruggiero and fly off with him. Ruggiero and the hippogriff land on an island in the middle of the ocean. As the hippogriff begins to eat the leaves of a myrtle bush, Ruggiero is startled to hear the bush begin to speak. The bush reveals that it was once a living soul named Sir Astolfo, and the island belongs to the sister sorceresses Alcina and Morgana. The beautiful Alcina seduces every knight that lands on her isle, but soon tires of her lovers and changes them into stones, animals, plants, or anything that strikes her fancy. Despite Astolfo's warning, Ruggiero strides off to meet this sorceress – and falls under her spell.

Act 1
Bradamante, again searching for her lover, arrives on Alcina's island with Ruggiero's former tutor, Melisso. Dressed in armor, Bradamante looks like a young man and goes by the name of her own brother, Ricciardo. She and Melisso possess a magic ring which enables the wearer to see through illusion, which they plan to use to break Alcina's spells and release her captives.

The first person they meet is the sorceress Morgana. Barely human and with no understanding of true love, she immediately abandons her own lover Oronte for the handsome 'Ricciardo.' Morgana conveys the visitors to Alcina's court, where Bradamante is dismayed to discover that Ruggiero is besotted with Alcina and in a state of complete amnesia about his previous life. Also at Alcina's court is a boy, Oberto, who is looking for his father, Astolfo, who was last seen heading toward this island. Bradamante guesses that Astolfo is now transformed into something, but she holds her peace and concerns herself with Ruggiero. Bradamante and Melisso rebuke Ruggiero for his desertion, but he can't think of anything except Alcina.

Meanwhile, Oronte discovers that Morgana has fallen in love with 'Ricciardo,' and challenges 'him' to a duel. Morgana stops the fight, but Oronte is in a foul mood and takes it out on Ruggiero. He tells the young man exactly how Alcina treats her former lovers and adds that, as far as he can tell, Alcina has fallen in love with the newcomer, Ricciardo (Semplicetto! A donna credi? Nr. 12). Ruggiero is horrified and overwhelms Alcina with his jealous fury. Things get even worse when 'Ricciardo' enters and pretends to admire Alcina. Alcina calms Ruggiero (Sì, son quella Nr. 13), but Bradamante is so upset at seeing her fiancé wooed before her very eyes that she reveals her true identity to Ruggiero (La bocca vaga, quell'occhio nero Nr. 14). Melisso hastily contradicts her and Ruggiero becomes very confused.

Alcina tells Morgana that she plans to turn Ricciardo into an animal, just to show Ruggiero how much she really loves him. Morgana begs Ricciardo to escape the island and Alcina's clutches, but 'he' says he'd rather stay, as he loves another. Morgana believes that this other person is herself, and the act ends with Morgana's aria "". (In some productions, this aria is sung by Alcina.)

Act 2
Melisso recalls Ruggiero to reason and duty by letting him wear the magic ring: under its influence, Ruggiero sees the island as it really is—a desert, peopled with monsters. Appalled, he realizes he must leave, and sings the famous aria "Verdi prati" ("Green meadows") where he admits that even though he knows the island and Alcina are mere illusion, their beauty will haunt him for the rest of his life.

Melisso warns Ruggiero that he cannot just leave; Alcina still wields immense power, and he should cover his escape by telling her that he wishes to go hunting. Ruggiero agrees, but, thoroughly bewildered by the magic and illusion surrounding him, he refuses to believe his eyes when he at last sees Bradamante as herself, believing that she may be another of Alcina's illusions. Bradamante is in despair, as is Alcina. Convinced of Ruggiero's indifference, she enters to turn Ricciardo into an animal, and Ruggiero has to pull himself together quickly and convince the sorceress that he does not need any proof of her love. It is at this point that the audience realises that Alcina genuinely loves Ruggiero; from now until the end of the opera, she is depicted sympathetically.

Oronte realizes that Ricciardo, Melisso and Ruggiero are in some sort of alliance, and Morgana and Alcina realise they are being deceived. But it is too late: Alcina's powers depend on illusion and, as true love enters her life, her magic powers slip away. As the act ends, Alcina tries to call up evil spirits to stop Ruggiero from leaving her, but her magic fails her.

Act 3
After this the opera finishes swiftly. Morgana and Oronte try to rebuild their relationship; she returns to him and he rebuffs her but (once she is offstage) admits he loves her
still. Ruggiero returns to his proper heroic status and sings an aria accompanied by high horns; Oberto is introduced to a lion, to whom he feels strangely attached, and Alcina sings a desolate aria in which she longs for oblivion.

Bradamante and Ruggiero decide that they need to destroy the source of Alcina's magic, usually represented as an urn. Alcina pleads with them, but Ruggiero is deaf to her appeals and smashes the urn. As he does so, everything is both ruined and restored. Alcina's magic palace crumbles to dust and she and Morgana sink into the ground, but Alcina's lovers are returned to their proper selves. The lion turns into Oberto's father, Astolfo, and other people stumble on, "I was a rock," says one, "I a tree" says another, and "I a wave in the ocean..." All the humans sing of their relief and joy, and Alcina is forgotten.

Audio recordings

Video recordings

References
Notes

Sources
. (The second of the two volume definitive reference on the operas of Handel)

External links
 Libretto from www.librettidopera.it
 Libretto with translations into English (Harriet Mason), German (Martina Seeber), and French (Michel Orcel)
 Summary from Opera-Opera.com (Second section down)
 Full score (German Handel Society: Leipzig. 1868)
 

Italian-language operas
Matter of France
Opera seria
1735 operas
Operas by George Frideric Handel
Operas
Operas based on works by Ludovico Ariosto
Opera world premieres at the Theatre Royal, Covent Garden
Fictional witches